Glenn Corbett (born Glenn Edwin Rothenburg; August 17, 1933 – January 16, 1993) was an American actor in movies and television for more than thirty years. He came to national attention in the early 1960s when he replaced George Maharis in the cast of the popular CBS adventure drama Route 66. He followed this with roles in high-profile films and television shows, including a guest role in the original Star Trek series, the daytime soap opera The Doctors, the prime-time soap Dallas, and movies such as Chisum with John Wayne, as one of Jimmy Stewart's sons in Shenandoah, and the World War II epic Midway.

Early years
An American lead actor and supporting actor, Corbett was born on August 17, 1933 in El Monte, California, the son of Sarah Bell (Holland) and John Warren Rothenburg, a garage mechanic.

After serving in the United States Navy as a Seabee, he met his wife Judy at Occidental College in Los Angeles, and, with her encouragement, he began acting in campus theater plays. He was seen by a talent scout and was signed to a contract with Columbia Pictures.

In his youth Corbett did male modeling for photographer Bob Mizer.

Film and television career
Corbett's film debut was in The Crimson Kimono (1959); it was followed with supporting roles in The Mountain Road (1960) and Man on a String (1960) ‘’  All the Young Men ‘’ (1960).  He took the lead role in William Castle's suspense thriller, Homicidal (1961) and was cast as one of the sons of Jimmy Stewart's character in the Civil War film Shenandoah (1965). In other film work, he starred as Pat Garrett, opposite John Wayne in Chisum (1970). He again co-starred with Wayne in Big Jake (1971). Later, he appeared in Nashville Girl (1976) and Midway (1976).

In 1963, Corbett replaced George Maharis on Route 66. Corbett, playing Lincoln Case, co-starred with Martin Milner during part of the third season and the fourth and final season of the series (1963–64). In 1964–65, he had a role on Twelve O'Clock High as Lt. Tom Lockridge for two episodes.

Corbett's other television roles in the early to late 1960s include Wes Macauley on It's a Man's World (1962–63). He was featured in 1964 as "Dan Collins" in an episode of Gunsmoke titled "Chicken" in which a man gets an undeserved reputation as a gunman when he is found at a way station with four dead outlaws at his feet.   Corbett was cast in a 1965 episode of Bonanza, titled Mighty is The Word, in which he portrayed a gunfighter who finds religion and becomes a preacher, only to be confronted by a vengeful man whose brother he once killed.   In the 1965–1966 season, Corbett guest-starred on The Legend of Jesse James. Corbett also guest-starred in an episode of The Virginian, entitled "The Awakening", in which his character, David Henderson, is a destitute former minister who has had a crisis of faith and comes to Medicine Bow just as a dispute breaks out at a local mine over safety issues. He appeared as "Chance Reynolds", a regular cast member on The Road West (1966–67). He guest-starred in the second season Star Trek episode "Metamorphosis" (1967) as Zefram Cochrane.

In 1971, Corbett had a guest appearance with Mariette Hartley on Gunsmoke (episode: "Phoenix"). In the 1970s, he had guest-starring roles on the television shows The Mod Squad, Cannon, The Streets of San Francisco, Police Woman, The Rockford Files, and Barnaby Jones.

In 1976, Corbett joined the cast of the NBC daytime soap opera The Doctors as Jason Aldrich. He stayed on The Doctors until 1981. Throughout the 1980s, Corbett was a recurring guest star on the long-running television series Dallas as Paul Morgan from 1983–84, and then from 1986–88.

Death
In January 1993, Corbett died of lung cancer at the Veterans Administration (VA) hospital in San Antonio, Texas at the age of 59. He was buried in Fort Sam Houston National Cemetery, San Antonio.

Selected TV and filmography

 Operation Petticoat (1959) as a Seaman
 The Crimson Kimono (1959) as Det. Sgt. Charlie Bancroft
 Man on a String (1960) as Frank Sanford
 The Mountain Road (1960) as Collins
 All the Young Men (1960) as Pvt. Wade, Medic
 Homicidal (1961) as Karl Anderson
 The Pirates of Blood River (1962) as Henry
 It's a Man's World (1962–1963, TV Series) as Wes Macauley / Wes Macaulay
 Route 66 (1963–1964, TV Series) as Linc Case
 Gunsmoke (1964–1974, TV Series) as Hargraves / Phoenix / Dan Collins
 The Man from U.N.C.L.E. (1965, TV Series) as Bernie Oren
 Bonanza (TV Series, 1965-1971) as Reverend Paul Watson  / Howie Landis
 Shenandoah (1965) as Jacob Anderson
 The Virginian (TV series, 1965; Episode 106 as David Henderson in "The Awakening" episode)
 The Road West (1966–1967, TV Series) as Chance Reynolds
 Star Trek (1967, TV Series) as Zefram Cochrane
 Land of the Giants (1968, TV Series) as Major Kagan
 Guns in the Heather (1969) as Tom
 Chisum (1970) as Pat Garrett
 Big Jake (1971) as O'Brien
 Night Gallery (1971, Series 2, Episode: "Brenda") as Brenda's Father
 Barnaby Jones (1973, Season 2, Episode: "Divorce-Murderer's style) as Charlie Cort
 Alias Smith and Jones (1972; Season 3, Episode 5 "Bushwhack!") as Marty
 Tote Taube in der Beethovenstraße (1973, TV Movie of series Tatort) as Sandy
 The Stranger (1973, TV Movie) as Neil Stryker
 Movin' On (1974, TV Series) as Tommy Trueblood
 Police Story (1974, Season 2, Episode 3 "Robbery: 48 Hours", TV series) as Detective Pruett
 Nashville Girl (1976) as Jeb
 Midway (1976) as Lieutenant Commander John C. Waldron
 The Doctors (1976–1982, TV Series) as Jason Aldrich
 The Rockford Files (1979; Episode: "The Battle-Ax and the Exploding Cigar") as FBI Agent Spelling
 Stunts Unlimited (1980) as Dirk Macauley
 The Fall Guy (1983, TV Series) as Steve Kruger
 Dallas (1983–1990, TV Series) as Paul Morgan
 Shadow Force (1992) as Al Finch Sr. (final film role)

References

External links 
 
 

1933 births
1993 deaths
American male film actors
American male television actors
Deaths from cancer in Texas
Deaths from lung cancer
Occidental College alumni
Male actors from California
Military personnel from California
People from El Monte, California
20th-century American male actors
Seabees
Male Western (genre) film actors